Takahiro Yamada may refer to:

 Takahiro Yamada (footballer), Japanese footballer
 Takahiro Yamada (musician), bass player and backing singer with Asian Kung-Fu Generation
 Takahiro Yamada (gymnast), Japanese gymnast